The Morila Gold Mine is an open-pit gold mine situated 180 km south of Bamako, near the community of Sanso, in the Sikasso Region of Mali. The operation is jointly owned by Firefinch Limited who owns 80%, while the Government of Mali owns the remaining 20%.

Apart from Morila, Firefinch also owns the Goulamina Lithium Project in Mali.

History
The Morila Gold Mine is one the world’s great open pit gold mines, having produced over 7.5Moz of gold since 2000 at grades that were among the highest in the world, earning it the moniker “Morila the Gorilla”. 

Firefinch acquired Morila for just US$28.9m in late 2020 with the strategic intent to rapidly increase production; initially targeting 70-90kozpa of gold from a combination of satellite pits, stocks and tailings, and thereafter growing production to 150-200kozpa of gold by mining the Morila Superpit. 

Morila’s current Global Resource is 2.43 million ounces of gold (Measured:  1.73Mt at 0.5g/t gold for 0.03Moz, Indicated: 26.7Mt at 1.49g/t gold for 1.28Moz and Inferred: 22.1Mt at 1.58g/t gold for 1.12Moz). However, Morila’s geological limits have not been tested. Exploration is therefore a major focus at the existing deposits and multiple targets on the 685km2 of surrounding tenure.

Production
Production figures of the recent past were:

References

External links 
 AngloGold Ashanti website
 Randgold website
 Morila mine (MLI-00122) Secretariat of the African, Caribbean and Pacific Group of States website
 Morila Gold Mine description ICMM website

Gold mines in Mali
Surface mines in Mali
AngloGold Ashanti
Sikasso Region
2000 establishments in Mali